Americana Master Series: Best of the Sugar Hill Years is an album by American singer-songwriter Guy Clark, released in 2007.

Track listing
 "Magnolia Wind" (Shawn Camp, Clark) – 3:50
 "Cold Dog Soup" (Clark, Mark Sanders) – 3:34
 "Soldier's Joy, 1864" (Camp, Clark) – 3:40
 "South Coast of Texas" [live] (Clark) – 3:53
 "Sis Draper" (Camp, Clark) – 3:42
 "Mud" (Clark, Buddy Mondlock) – 3:45
 "Ain't No Trouble to Me" (Clark, Jon Stewart) – 3:00
 "A Little of Both" [live] (Clark, Verlon Thompson) – 3:41
 "Dancin Days" (Clark, Steve Nelson) – 3:27
 "Fort Worth Blues" (Steve Earle) – 4:31
 "Red River" (Clark) – 3:03
 "Arizona Star" (Rich Alves, Clark) – 3:25
 "Bunkhouse Blues" (Clark, Thompson) – 3:06
 "Queenie's Song" (Terry Allen, Clark) – 2:38
 "Out in the Parking Lot" [live] (Clark, Darrell Scott) – 4:20

Personnel
Guy Clark – vocals, guitar
Shawn Camp – fiddle, guitar, harmony vocals
Travis Clark	 Bass
Emmylou Harris – harmony vocals
Tim O'Brien – fiddle
Suzy Ragsdale – accordion, harmony vocals
David Rawlings – harmony vocals
Darrell Scott – banjo, dobro, guitar, mandolin, accordion, mandocello, bass, harmony vocals, marimbula, mandocello
Verlon Thompson – guitar, harmonica, mandolin, harmony vocals, percussion, National Steel guitar, banjo
Gillian Welch – harmony vocals

References

2007 greatest hits albums
Guy Clark compilation albums
Sugar Hill Records compilation albums
Americana albums